Potentilla basaltica is a species of flowering plant in the rose family known by the common names Soldier Meadows cinquefoil  and basalt cinquefoil. It is endemic to a small area of the Modoc Plateau and Warner Mountains in northeastern California and northwestern Nevada.

Range and habitat
Potentilla basaltica occurs in Humboldt County, Nevada, and Lassen County, California, where there are a total of four occurrences. It grows in moist alkaline meadows near streams and springs.

Associates
Associated species include: Juncus balticus, Scirpus maritimus, Scirpus acutus, Triglochin maritima, Distichlis spicata, Sisyrinchium halophilum, Nitrophila occidentalis, Carex spp., Pyrrocoma racemosa, Solidago spectabilis, Sphaeromeria potentilloides, Astragalus argophyllus, Lotus purshianus, Ericameria nauseosa, and Sarcobatus vermiculatus.

Growth pattern
Potentilla basaltica is a perennial herb grows from a thick taproot and has a base covered in the remnants of previous seasons' leaves. The stems are usually prostrate or decumbent, spreading along the ground, or occasionally growing upright.

Stems and leaves
Stems are up to 50 centimeters long and may be purple-tinged. Most of the leaves are located around the base of the plant. They are each divided into several pairs of leaflets. There are a few smaller leaves located along the stems.

Flowers
The flowers at the ends of the stems have bright yellow petals.

Conservation
This rare species is a candidate for federal protection. The Bureau of Land Management has enacted conservation measures such as fencing populations to exclude grazing animals and closing roads in vulnerable habitat. Current threats include changes in local hydrology and the invasion of noxious weeds, such as Lepidium latifolium. The populations are apparently stable for the time being.

This species is a host for the fungus Phragmidium ivesiae.

References

External links
Jepson Manual Treatment: Potentilla basaltica 
USDA Plants Profile
Potentilla basaltica — U.C. Photo Gallery

basaltica
Flora of California
Flora of Nevada
Endemic flora of the United States
Flora of the Great Basin
Natural history of Lassen County, California
Humboldt County, Nevada
Plants described in 1984
Critically endangered flora of California